Peter Voss, Thief of Millions or The Man Without a Name (German: Der Mann ohne Namen) is a 1921 German silent adventure film directed by Georg Jacoby and starring Harry Liedtke, Paul Otto, and Mady Christians. It was released in six separate parts. A number of such serials were made during the early Weimar Republic, including Joe May's The Mistress of the World.

It is based on the novel Peter Voss, Thief of Millions by Ewald Gerhard Seeliger which has been adapted for the screen a number of times. The film's sets were designed by the art director Kurt Richter. It was shot at the Tempelhof Studios with extensive location filming taking place in Denmark, Italy, Spain, Morocco, and Dalmatia.

Cast
 Harry Liedtke as Peter Voß 
 Paul Otto as Alexander Voss 
 Jakob Tiedtke as Frederik Nissen 
 Mady Christians as Gert
 Lori Leux as Mabel 
 Georg Alexander as Bobby Dodd 
 Erich Kaiser-Titz as Prinz Abdul Hassan / Pol, Stierkämpfer 
 Karl Harbacher as James Morton 
 Edith Meller as Conchita 
 Tzwetta Tzatschewa as Roschana 
 Louis Brody as Bill Burns
 Heinrich Marlow
 Charles Puffy 
 Hermann Picha
 Henry Bender
 Ferdinand von Alten
 Hubert von Meyerinck
 Gustav Botz
 Blandine Ebinger
 Albert Paulig
 Bruno Lopinski
 Paul Biensfeldt
 Paul Morgan

References

External links
 
 
 
 
 
 

1921 films
Films of the Weimar Republic
Films directed by Georg Jacoby
German silent feature films
1921 adventure films
German adventure films
UFA GmbH films
German black-and-white films
Films shot at Tempelhof Studios
Films based on German novels
Silent adventure films
1920s German films